KVD-1 was an upper stage LOX/LH cryogenic engine developed by the Isayev Design Bureau (now KB KhIMMASH) of Russia in the early 1960s. It is a modified version of the RD-56, developed for a never-completed cryogenic upper stage of the N-1 super-heavy lift rocket, with the goal of enabling crewed lunar missions by the USSR. The KVD-1 produces a thrust of 7.5 tonnes.

Initial development
KVD-1 was originated from the RD-56 engine which were intended to be used for USSR Moon programmes. RD-56 aka 11D56 engines were developed for N1M rocket programme, the planned derivative of N1, but later they were abandoned due to four successive launch failures of N1. Later the design of the engine was sold to ISRO under the name "KVD-1" under a deal worth $120 million  with soviet agency Glavkosmos which enabled ISRO to import 2 KVD-1 engines and an agreement for transfer of technology from Russia.

ISRO programme

The engines were proven to be inefficient because of their low thrust-to-weight ratio. Later the Russian space agency optimised the engine to launch payloads with a mass of 2.5 tonnes or less. The INSAT-4CR satellite with a mass of 2,140 kg was launched in 2007 but reached a lower than planned orbit due to the poor performance of the third stage's single KVD-1 engine.  The satellite subsequently used its own propulsion to get to the planned orbit.  Because of this the useful life of the satellite was shortened.

Sanctions imposed by United States
In 1991, an agreement was signed between India and Russia for technology transfer to India so that KVD-1 engines can be built indigenously in India. But later in July 1993, US imposed sanctions on ISRO and Glavkosmos saying it voids the Missile Technology Control Regime. After suffering setback in this case ISRO was forced to develop its own cryogenic programme.

Features
The engine was single chamber fueled rocket which could be used as cryogenic engines for launching of spacecraft that could be put in elliptical and geostationary orbits.
 Unfueled mass: 282 kg (621 lb)
 Height: 2.14 m
 Diameter: 1.56 m
 Specific impulse: 462 seconds
 Thrust: 69.60 kN (15,647 lbf) 
 Burn time: 800 seconds
 Nozzle ratio：200

Use
KVD-1 was used in following launch vehicles
 GSLV Mk I

References

External links 
 astronautix.com

Rocket engines of the Soviet Union
Rocket engines using hydrogen propellant
Rocket engines using the staged combustion cycle
Rocket engines of Russia
KB KhimMash rocket engines
India–Soviet Union relations